Calofulcinia elegans is a species of praying mantis in the family Nanomantidae. It is found in New Guinea.

References 

Nanomantidae
Insects described in 1915
Mantodea of Oceania
Taxa named by Ermanno Giglio-Tos